Sive may refer to:

 David Sive (1922–2014), American attorney, environmentalist, and professor of environmental law
 Sive (noun), a Nation, a large body of people united by common descent, history, culture, or language, inhabiting a particular state or territory.
 Sive (company), SiveHost.com, or SiveICT.co.za. A technology company focusing on online systems, mobile Apps, Business Email Services and Website Hosting.
 Sive (name), anglicised spelling of Sadhbh, an Irish female given name
 Sive (play), by John B. Keane
 Sive (musician), stage name of Sadhbh O'Sullivan
 Alternative spelling for "Sadhbh Ní Bhruinneallaigh" an Irish folk song that was given the moniker by Celtic Woman